Brooke Andersen (born August 23, 1995) is an American track and field athlete known for throwing events. On July 17, 2022, at the World Championships in Eugene, Oregon, Brooke Andersen won the gold medal with a hammer throw of 78.96 m.

Career
In July 2022, Brooke Andersen signed with Nike.

At the 2021, Olympic Trials she placed second overall which secured her position on the Olympic Team in Tokyo. There she went on to hit the Automatic Qualifier mark and secure a spot in the Olympic final. Andersen managed to take tenth in her first Olympic Games.

In both 2018 and 2019, she finished third behind DeAnna Price and Gwen Berry at the USA Outdoor Track and Field Championships (the number 4 and 5 throwers of all time respectively).  The 2019 place guarantees her a spot on the American team at the 2019 World Athletics Championships.  Later she won the silver medal at the 2019 Pan American Games behind Berry's last round Pan American Games record, both Americans defeating the defending champion Rosa Rodríguez.  Andersen was on the medal stand when Berry raised her fist in protest of injustice in America “and a president who’s making it worse.”

In the 2018 NACAC Championship, Andersen competed in the hammer for Team USA.

Achievements

NCAA career
Brooke Andersen was named to the 2018 Big Sky Conference student athlete team and NAU scholar-athlete of the year (2017-2018).

She competed collegiately for Northern Arizona University, finished second in the hammer at the 2017 and 2018 NCAA  Championships.

In college she also threw the weight throw.

High School career

While competing at Rancho Buena Vista High School in her hometown of Vista, California, Andersen threw the discus, placed ninth in the San Diego Section championship in 2013.

Jay Hibert, her high school coach with help from California Community College Athletic Association Hall of Fame coach Lloyd Higgins introduced her to the hammer as a high school athlete.

Brooke Andersen played 14 years of soccer as a youth through high school.

References

External links
 

1995 births
Living people
American female hammer throwers
American female discus throwers
Female weight throwers
Pan American Games track and field athletes for the United States
Pan American Games silver medalists for the United States
Athletes (track and field) at the 2019 Pan American Games
Northern Arizona Lumberjacks women's track and field athletes
Track and field athletes from California
Environmental economists
Environmental social scientists
Pan American Games medalists in athletics (track and field)
Medalists at the 2019 Pan American Games
Athletes (track and field) at the 2020 Summer Olympics
Olympic track and field athletes of the United States
Sportspeople from San Diego
21st-century American women